Gilbreath-McLorn House, also known as the McLorn House and Gilbreath Homestead, is a historic home located at La Plata, Macon County, Missouri.  It was built in 1896, and is a two-story, Queen Anne style frame dwelling with full attic and basement.  It has a multi-gabled roof and octagonal tower, wraparound porch with Eastlake movement scrolled brackets, and two additional hip-roofed porches.

It was listed on the National Register of Historic Places in 1978.

References

Houses on the National Register of Historic Places in Missouri
Queen Anne architecture in Missouri
Houses completed in 1896
Houses in Macon County, Missouri
National Register of Historic Places in Macon County, Missouri